Farewell to Matyora is a 1976 novel by Valentin Rasputin. The novel treats Rasputin's major theme of the baneful impact of industrialization and urbanization on peasant life. It is considered a classic example of the village prose literary movement.

The book was adapted into the 1983 film Farewell, directed by Elem Klimov.

References

1976 Russian novels
Soviet novels
Russian novels adapted into films